Asociația Fotbal Club Astra Giurgiu, commonly known as Astra Giurgiu or simply Astra, was a Romanian football club based in the city of Giurgiu, Giurgiu County. Founded in 1921 in Ploiești as Clubul Sportiv Astra-Română, it spent the majority of its history in the lower leagues. In October 2022, the team withdrew from the Liga III championship and was subsequently dissolved.

Astra only began to achieve success in the late 1990s under the ownership of businessman Ioan Niculae, having reached the top flight for the first time in 1998. In 2012, after more than nine decades in Prahova County, it moved its home ground south to Giurgiu, a city at the border with Bulgaria. On short notice, Astra became a prominent figure in Romanian football and head coach Marius Șumudică won it the national title in the 2015–16 season.

The club also held one Cupa României and two Supercupa României trophies. Between 2017 and 2021, Astra lost three Cupa României finals, all on the home ground of its former local opponent, Petrolul Ploiești. Internationally, its best performance was reaching the UEFA Europa League round of 32 in the 2016–17 season.

The colours of the team were white and black, hence the old nickname Dracii negri (The Black Devils). Red was also worn on many occasions on the away kits. Their last home stadium was Marin Anastasovici, which had a capacity of 8,500.

History

Founding, early years and lower divisions (1921–1996)

On 18 September 1921, the weekly newspaper Ecoul Sportiv announced the founding of the Clubul Sportiv Astra-Română ("Astra-Romanian Sports Club") by the Astra-Română Society, an oil-company owned by Henri Deterding and based in Prahova and composed of English, American and Dutch officials.

Initially, the club consisted of several football sides based in towns from the entire county. In the summer of 1934, the refinery organised the inaugural edition of a tournament open for all the Astra teams, called the Astra Societies Cup. The matches were played in the town of Moreni. At the time, the refinery had only one team, Astra Română Câmpina, that was playing in the district championship. To make the cup more attractive, the society created three new football sides for the event: Astra Română Moreni, Astra Română Boldești and Astra Română Unirea Hârsa. After the 1937 edition of the Cup, the society decided to merge all of its Prahova teams and thus created Astra Română Ploiești on 29 May 1937. The team was registered in the district championship. Just a few months after the team's foundation, the society changed its name to Columbia and moved it to a ground located near the society's headquarters, in Câmpina. In May 1945, Astra Română Ploiești was reformed and played its home matches on the old Columbia Stadium, a stadium that still exists today in Ploiești and was used as a training ground by the team.

In the summer of 1992, Astra were promoted for the first time to the Divizia C. The following seasons it finished 6th, 12th, 3rd and 14th in the championship.

Ascent under Niculae's ownership (1996–2013)

In the summer of 1996, the club merged with Danubiana București, it changed its name to Danubiana Ploiești, and played for the first time in the Divizia B. After one season the club changed its name back to Astra. Since that year, Ioan Niculae had been the owner of the team. In 1998, Astra were promoted to the Divizia A for the first time. They played at this level for five consecutive seasons, until 2003, when it merged with Petrolul Ploiești. Two years of pause pass for Astra, until 2005, when Ioan Niculae founded once again the club directly in the Liga II. It was relegated to the Liga III after only one season. In the summer of 2007, under the name of FC Ploiești, the team promoted back to the Liga II. In 2009, after six years, it finally promoted back to Liga I, with promotion achieved at the end of the 2008–09 season. It changed its name back to the traditional Astra Ploiești and the black and white colours were brought back, hence the team's old nickname, "The Black Devils".

After 91 years in Ploiești, in September 2012, the club moved to Giurgiu. The last match played in the Astra Stadium was on 2 September 2012, against Bucharest giants Dinamo București, won by Astra 1–0. The first game played on the Marin Anastasovici Stadium was on 23 September 2012, against Gaz Metan Mediaș. Astra won 4–0.

It qualified for the first time to the UEFA Europa League at the end of the 2012–13 Liga I season, after finishing 4th in the table.

The 2013–14 season was the most successful season in the club's history, reaching 2nd place in Liga I, losing the title by only five points to Steaua București and winning the Romanian Cup on penalties against the same team, Steaua. One month later they defeated Steaua București on penalties again, and won the Romanian Supercup.

First European participations and Șumudică era (2013–2017)

Astra Giurgiu played its first European match ever in first qualification round of UEFA Europa League against Domžale, winning 1–0 in the first leg. In the second leg in Bucharest, Astra won 2–0 and qualified. In the second qualification round, Astra draw 1–1 with Omonia in the first leg in Bucharest and beat 2–1 in the second leg in Nicosia to advance. Seeded team after eliminating Omonia, Astra was drawn in third qualification round with Trenčín and qualified after winning 3–1 the first leg in Dubnica nad Váhom and drawing 2–2 in the second leg in Bucharest. In play-off, Astra faced the very first European defeat in a 0–2 against Maccabi Haifa in the first leg in Haifa, thus being eliminated after drawing 1–1 in the second leg in Bucharest.

Astra qualified directly in the third qualifying round after winning the Romanian Cup and met Slovan Liberec, winning both legs 3–0 in Giurgiu and 3–2 in Liberec, this time being the first European match to take place in Giurgiu. In the play-off round, Astra met Olympique Lyonnais, defeating them away in Lyon in a 2–1 win, with Kehinde Fatai and Constantin Budescu scoring the goals of victory. In Giurgiu, Lyon won 1–0 but Astra Giurgiu went on to the group stage phase due to the away goals rule. They were subsequently drawn in Group D alongside Red Bull Salzburg, Celtic and Dinamo Zagreb. Astra began their group stage adventure with a harmful 1–5 defeat at Stadion Maksimir in Zagreb against Croatian champions Dinamo, ending with Aurelian Chițu scoring their first goal in the group stages of a European cup. On 2 October 2014, Astra played Red Bull Salzburg one of the most important matches held on Marin Anastasovici Stadium in Giurgiu. Astra took the 1–0 lead with Takayuki Seto's goal, but were stunned by Jonatan Soriano's winner, losing 1–2. On matchday 3, Astra faced Celtic at Glasgow in a match which ended 1–2. On matchday 4, Astra hold Celtic in a 1–1 draw at Giurgiu, with William Amorim scoring the equaliser that brought their first group stage point. On matchday 5, Astra won 1–0 against Dinamo Zagreb with Sadat Bukari's winner, and secured its first ever victory in the Europa League group stages. Astra's Europa League campaign concluded at Red Bull Arena in Salzburg with another heavy 1–5 defeat to Red Bull. Astra ended in fourth place with four points, behind Salzburg (16 points), Celtic (8) and Dinamo (6).

On 28 April 2015, Marius Șumudică was appointed as the new head coach, following Dorinel Munteanu's resignation. It would be Sumudica's third term at the club, following two short spells in 2009 and 2011. His first game in charge was a 2–1 away victory against rivals Petrolul Ploiești. He eventually led the team to a fourth-place finish, assuring qualification for the 2015–16-second round of the UEFA Europa League.

In the second round of the Europa League, Astra were paired with Inverness Caledonian Thistle, which resulted in a 1–0 Astra win on aggregate after a goal from Constantin Budescu. The third round proved to be extremely difficult, however, as Astra was drawn with English club West Ham United. A surprising 2–2 draw at London, followed by a 2–1 victory in Giurgiu, qualified Astra for the play-off round, where they faced Dutch club AZ. A 3–2 home victory for Giurgiu was not enough to see Astra qualified to the group stage as AZ won the reverse match in Alkmaar 2–0, thus ending the club's European campaign.

In the domestic league, Astra managed to impress. Despite having a poor start which included a severe 1–5 defeat from vice-champions ASA Targu Mures, the Astralii managed to finish the regular seasons champions. During this time, however, manager Marius Șumudică was convicted of betting on domestic matches, prompting his suspension by Romanian FA for the remainder of the season. On appeal, Șumudică managed to reduce his suspension to two months, and also begin to apply at the start of the 2016–17 Liga I. On 1 May 2016, after a draw between FC Steaua and Pandurii Tg. Jiu, Astra Giurgiu won the 2015–16 Liga I. This was Șumudică's first domestic title, and also made Giurgiu the 13th Romanian city to have won a national title, after Bucharest, Timișoara, Ploiești, Arad, Craiova, Cluj-Napoca, Pitești, Oradea, Brașov, Reșița, Urziceni and Galați. Astra also later won the 2016 Supercup against CFR Cluj.

Astra qualified for the UEFA Champions League, but were quickly eliminated by Danish side Copenhagen. Astra reached the play-off round of the 2016–17 UEFA Europa League and faced West Ham, which they also met – and defeated – one year prior. The club defeated West Ham 0–1 in London and reached the group stage of the Europa League, where they were drawn in Group E alongside Roma, Viktoria Plzeň and Austria Wien. Despite having zero points after two rounds, Astra Giurgiu managed to defeat Viktoria Plzeň and Austria Wien in away matches; this, in addition to a 0–0 draw with Roma and Austria Wien's failure against Plzeň secured Astra's place in the tournament's round of 32, where they faced Genk. A 2–2 draw at Giurgiu followed by a defeat, 0–1 in Belgium ended Astra Giurgiu's best European campaign in history.

In the league, Astra had a very disappointing campaign, struggling for the majority of the regular season in the second half of the table. However, a fantastic streak of 8 consecutive wins allowed the Giurgiu club to finish 3rd in the regular season, and to qualify for the play-offs of 2016–17 Liga 1. The good form didn't last however, as they managed to gather just 5 points in the play-offs and eventually finished 6th. On 27 May, Astra lost the Romanian Cup Final against FC Voluntari after a penalty shootout, however because FC Voluntari didn't apply early enough for a European License to participate in the 2017–18 Europa League, the vacant spot was given to Astra, thus qualifying yet again in Europe.

Period of ups and downs (2017–2020)
In the summer of 2017, head coach Șumudică left Astra Giurgiu after his contract expired and was replaced by Edward Iordănescu, and also the first-team squad was almost entirely changed. This season was meant for the reconstruction of the team. The team budget was strictly decreased and Astra's new squad was the second youngest in the league. Manager Edward “Edi” Iordanescu brought in experienced players such as Filip Mrzljak, Florin Bejan, Erico Constantino da Silva, Piotr Polczak, and Anatole Abang. In the first match of the season, Astra easily won 3–1 at Giurgiu against Azerbaijani minnows Zira FK with more than half of the team being debutants. After a 0–0 in Baku they qualified in the Europa League 3rd qualifying round. They were drawn against Ukrainian club FC Oleksandriya, and, after a uneventful 0–0 draw at Giurgiu, Astra were beaten 1–0 in Ukraine in the last match ever played in an international competition. Nobody had big expectations from the former champions that season, but they had a very good campaign qualifying for the Play-offs with a match to spare and finishing 5th in the league, just two points off the European spots. The style of play changed too, from Sumudica's attack minded free-flowing style to a more defensive, counter-attack based playstyle. That season, Astra was a team hard to beat by the big teams, and rarely put a foot wrong against smaller clubs. Their best player that season was their goalkeeper Plamen Iliev who had many outstanding performances. Also, Alexandru Ionita had a spectacular breakout season
scoring 10 goals in 20 games before being sold in the winter to eventual league winners CFR Cluj. Another remarkable player was the youngster Silviu Balaure with 8 goals. Even though it was a solid campaign, after a surprise elimination from the quarter finals of the Romanian Cup and public criticism from the owner for the boring style of play Edi Iordanescu resigned from the job with 8 games left. At Astra, Edi won 15 games, drew 10 and lost 10, conceding only 35 goals in as many matches. He was replaced by Gheorghe Multescu for the remainder of the season.

After the season ended, the assistant Marius Maldarasanu was named the head coach of the team, this being his managerial debut. In the summer window, a big wave of French players were brought to the club, Mike Cestor, Julien Bègue, Djiman Koukou, to name a few. Two other important additions were former Gaz Metan Medias winger Azdren Llullaku and midfielder Nelut Rosu. Even though the team started the season very good with a surprising 1–0 win over the vice-champions FCSB, secured by a Llullaku header after a corner kick, Astra was yet to sign a striker for the campaign. A few days later, owner Ioan Niculae announced that Astra Giurgiu manage to buy back their former star attacker Denis Alibec, for 1 million euro, from FCSB, where he was excluded from the team after a ugly fallout with the chairman Mihai Stoica, coach Nicolae Dică and FCSB supporters. The transfer came as a big surprise, because Niculae was known to be very cheap in the past, not wanting to invest too much into football. He made his debut in a away draw at Iasi, where Llullaku managed to score again, this time from a penalty kick. Under Maldarasanu, the team had spirit, but was tactically inept, and, even though the team was unbeaten in the first seven games of the campaign, Maldarasanu was sacked after winning only two games, losing important points in draws against small teams. Gheorghe Multescu was brought back at the helm, and had immediate impact, winning his first three games in charge, a 2–1 win against FC Dinamo București, in which Alibec scored his first goal after his return to the team, an impressive 3–0 victory against play-off contanders Gaz Metan Medias and a 5–1 stomping in the Romanian Cup against second divisionary CS Luceafărul Oradea. After 10 rounds Astra Giurgiu was the only team undefeated in the league. This changed after a controversial 1–0 loss against FC Viitorul Constanța, in which Alibec missed because of an injury, and Astra played for more than an hour in 10-men because of defender Erico, who was sent off in the first half after many reckless fouls. Astra defended heroically all game, and, in the 90th minute, their goalkeeper threw the ball out of the field because his teammate was injured. Gheorghe Hagi's boys did not gave the ball back to Astra, and instead, crossed the ball and scored a last minute winner, winning the game in a very non-fair play way. After this game, a series of 4 defeats in his next 5 league games saw Multescu sacked and replaced with ex-FC Botoșani manager Costel Enache. 

Enache's first game in charge was a 1–0 defeat against Sepsi OSK, after this result Astra fell off the play-off spots for the first time in over a year. However, even if he failed to win his first 2 games at the helm, he led the team to a fantastic 11 games unbeaten streak which secured an easy play-off qualification, finishing the regular season in 4th place. Under Costel Enache, Astra Giurgiu played a very possession-based style of play, using many short passes to open up defenses. They had the 3rd best attack and second best defense in the league at the end of the main campaign. Denis Alibec was their most important asset, and, even though he scored only five goals and was held back by injuries, he was the main creator of the team, providing many clear chances to his teammates. Another star of the team was the center-back Mike Cestor, who was included in the team of the season. Also, youngsters Mihai Butean and Valentin Gheorghe broke into the first team. After the very good main campaign, the team had high hopes for the play-off, hoping to qualify for European competitions. However, this was not the case, and the team suffered a meltdown. After many financial problems, the players protested in the media, openly criticizing the owner Ioan Niculae for not paying their wages and boycotted training. Right-back Claudiu Belu even got his contract terminated after he complained about the money issue in a post match conference. Many first team starters filed a memorandum. The last few months of the season were nightmarish, losing eight games out of ten in the play-off, managing to beat only Sepsi OSK. Astra Giurgiu had a very easy road to the final of the Romanian Cup. Up until the final, they played only second division teams or teams who were not interested in the competition, using their B-side. After breezing past CS Luceafărul Oradea, FC Universitatea Cluj FC Dunărea Călărași and CFR Cluj, Astra faced FC Viitorul Constanța in the final. Alibec opened the score from a free kick right before half-time against the run of play. Viitorul dominated the game and Astra was forced to defend with all its resources and hoped to clinch the victory, but in the 72nd minute a series of unfortunate events started. Alibec was injured and substituted, five minutes later Viitorul equalized from a corner, and another 5 minutes later Romário Pires was sent off for a second yellow. In extra time, Astra changed the system to five defenders but still conceded a goal and lost their second final in the last three years, and also lost the chance to play in the Europa League next season. At the end of the campaign, most of the important players left for free alongside Costel Enache, who finished his contract with the club.

In the summer of 2019, Dan Alexa was named as the new coach. Before signing with Astra Giurgiu, Alexa was a "yoyo" manager, because in all his managerial career he either promoted or got relegated every season. The Astra job was his chance to affirm himself at a bigger level. With the help of his controversial impresario Anamaria Prodan he recruited a big number of important new players such as Daniel Graovac, Mihai Răduț, Gabriel Tamaș and Ljuban Crepulja. The biggest transfer was the surprising return of former star playmaker Constantin Budescu, reforming the unstoppable duo Alibec-Budescu. Throughout the season, a lot of former players returned to the club. Former title winners Gabriel Enache, Alexandru Dandea, Alexandru Ioniță and club legend Takayuki Seto returned to the team alongside former goal-scorer Kehinde Fatai. Despite the quality of his squad, Alexa had a short and awful stint as Astra Giurgiu manager. After a 2–2 draw against FC Botoșani in his debut he was filmed getting punched in the face by Anamaria Prodan after a disagreement about a player she brought to the club. After only two games he wanted to quit. He was finally fired after a dreadful 0–0 performance at home against FC Hermannstadt. With one of the best squads in the league he managed only four wins, four draws and four losses. Even though he was considered a defensive manager, the team conceded a goal in 11 out of 12 games and struggled to create chances, playing one of the most uninspired, boring and depressing football in the club's history. The naming of Dan Alexa in charge of the club was a big failure. 

Bogdan Andone, Sumudica's former assistant from the 2016 title winning squad, was put in charge of the team. The style massively improved under Andone. A young and very promising manager, Andone played a defensive game-style, heavily based on lethal counter-attacks. Impressively, he won his first ten league games in charge, grinding many 1–0 wins. Before the winter break, the team even got in the first place of the league for the first time in the last four years and had aspirations for a new title. Unfortunately, the ever present money problems took a toll on the team. Astra was even docked three points, and failed to win any of their last four games of the regular season, barely qualifying for the play-offs, after a lucky draw against Sepsi OSK in which they scored 2 goals in only one minute. Qualified in the play-off for the 5th season in a row (a record held only by them and FCSB) the team regained its form. But, during the COVID-19 quarantine, disappointment struck again, because, for financial reasons, Astra Giurgiu failed to gain the European license, meaning that they can't play in the Europa League next season. Even though Astra had nothing left to play for, the team easily finished on the podium of Liga 1. Although the team was heavily held back by its money problems and had potential to achieve even more, Astra had a great campaign, finishing in third place and losing only one game at home all season.

Struggling during the COVID-19 pandemic, relegation and dissolvement (2020–2022)

Due to the club's growing financial problems, Astra's goal shifted from progressing to European competitions towards the club's stay in top flight in the wake of the new season. The pandemic left a stain on Astra's already poor financial state, falling behind with the player wages. Furthermore, the club was risking relegation on doping charges, noting that three of Astra's key players, Ioniță, Seto, and Fatai, were under investigation for using illegal methods of vitaminization; the three players were suspended. 

Additionally, in February 2021, owner Ioan Niculae was sentenced to 5 years in prison for money laundering. At the end of the 2020-21 Liga I season, bereft of their best players and struggling due to financial pressures, Astra Giurgiu relegated, after a poor performance in the play-out, returning to the second division of Romanian football after 12 years. They also reached, but subsequently lost the 2020–21 Cupa României final, losing 3–2 to CSU Craiova on extra time.

On 18 October 2022, Astra Giurgiu requested withdrawal from Liga III, and the following day, the club folded after 101 years of existence.

Crest and colours

Emblem
The teams last crest was adopted in July 2009, following the team's promotion from Liga II. The design was based on a classical template, and was characterized by the same black and white stripes which could be found on the team's shirts. The numerous stars which adorn the crest have their origin in the club's name, with Astra (like Steaua) being a Romanian word which translates as "The Star".

Kit
Currently, Astra Giurgiu's primary colors were white and black, although the kit design also included red on many occasions, especially on away outfits.

Grounds

Astra played its home matches in Giurgiu at the Marin Anastasovici Stadium, which had a current capacity of approximately 8,500 spectators. With the club having moved here since September 2012, the former Astra Stadium in Ploiești now acts as a training ground.

Support

Rivalries

After Astra's first promotion to the Divizia A in the summer of 1998, its fans engaged in a grudge with their cross-town rivals Petrolul Ploiești. Often, the matches between Astra and Petrolul ended with clashes between the supporters. Most Astra fans considered Petrolul as their main rivals, however Lupii galbeni regard Rapid București as their principal arch-enemies. The rivalry was kept despite Astra's move to Giurgiu, and the match was sometimes referred to as Fostul derbi al Ploieștiului (Former Ploiești derby).

Honours

Domestic

Leagues
Liga I
Winners (1): 2015–16
Runners-up (1): 2013–14

Liga II
Winners (1): 1997–98
Runners-up (1): 2008–09

Liga III
Winners (1): 2007–08

Cups
Cupa României
Winners (1): 2013–14
Runners-up (3): 2016–17, 2018–19, 2020–21

Supercupa României
Winners (2): 2014, 2016

Rankings
This was the UEFA club's coefficient as of August 2020:

Shirt sponsors and manufacturers

Records and statistics

League history

League Cup history

European Cups history

Notes for abbreviations in the above table:

 1Q: First qualifying round
 2Q: Second qualifying round
 3Q: Third qualifying round
 PO: Play-off round

European cups all-time statistics

Notable former players
The footballers enlisted below have had international cap(s) for their respective countries at junior and/or senior level and/or more than 100 caps for FC Astra Giurgiu.

  Marius Alexe 
  Ștefan Bărboianu 
  Dănuț Coman
  Mihai Dăscălescu
  Florentin Dumitru
  Gabriel Enache
  Marius Lățescu
  Valerică Găman
  Liviu Ganea
  Lucian Goian
  Róbert Ilyés
  Dan Lăcustă
  Florin Lovin
  Andrei Mureșan
  Bogdan Nicolae
  Cristian Oroș
  Ion Sburlea
  Pompiliu Stoica

  Sorin Strătilă 
  Costel Lazăr
  Silviu Lung Jr.
  Alexandru Mățel
  Ovidiu Mihalache
  Cătălin Mulțescu
  Daniel Niculae
  Daniel Petroesc
  Gheorghe Rohat
  Cristian Săpunaru
  Alexandru Stan
  Alexandru Ioniță  
  Denis Alibec
  Constantin Budescu
Brazil
  Fernando Boldrin
  William De Amorim
  Júnior Morais 

Bosnia and Herzegovina 
  Daniel Graovac 
Bulgaria
  Plamen Iliev
Croatia
  Filip Mrzljak
Cyprus
  Vincent Laban 
France
  Mike Cestor
  Anthony Le Tallec
  Karim Yoda
Ghana
  Seidu Yahaya
  Sadat Bukari

Japan
  Takayuki Seto
Macedonia
  Mirko Ivanovski 
Nigeria
  Kehinde Fatai
Portugal
  Geraldo Alves
  Filipe Teixeira 
Senegal
  Ousmane N'Doye
Tunisia
  Syam Ben Youssef
Zambia
  Fwayo Tembo

Notable former managers

  Marius Șumudică 
  Daniel Isăilă 
  Costel Enache

References

External links
 Official website 
 Club profile on UEFA's official website
 Club profile on LPF's official website 

 
Football clubs in Giurgiu County
Sport in Giurgiu
Association football clubs established in 1921
Association football clubs disestablished in 2022
Liga I clubs
Liga II clubs
Liga III clubs
1921 establishments in Romania
2022 disestablishments in Romania